La Petite Décharge is a tributary of La Grosse Décharge, flowing in the unorganized territory of Lac-Ministuk, in the Le Fjord-du-Saguenay Regional County Municipality, in the administrative region of Saguenay–Lac-Saint-Jean, in the province of Quebec, in Canada. The course of "La Petite Décharge" crosses the northern part of the zec Mars-Moulin.

This small valley is served by the "Chemin de la Consol Paper" and the "Chemin des Lac des Maltais". A few other secondary forest roads serve "La Petite Décharge" valley, especially for forestry and recreational tourism activities.

Forestry is the main economic activity in this valley; recreational tourism, second.

The surface of "La Petite Décharge" is usually frozen from the beginning of December to the end of March, however the safe circulation on the ice is generally done from mid-December to mid-March.

Geography 
The main watersheds neighboring "La Petite Décharge" are:
 north side: Lac des Maltais, Gauthier River, Paradis brook, rivière du Moulin, Saguenay River;
 east side: rivière à Mars, Lake Como, Bras du Coco, Bras Rocheux, Bras d'Hamel, Ha! Ha! River;
 south side: rivière du Moulin, Bras de Jacob, Bras Henriette,
 west side: rivière du Moulin, Pères lake, Bras Henriette.

The Little Landfill rises at the confluence of two streams in forest and mountainous areas. This source is located at:
  north-east of the course of the rivière du Moulin;
  south-east of the village of Laterrière;
  south-west of the confluence of the Petite Décharge and la Grosse Décharge;
  south-east of the Portage-des-Roches dam, erected at the head of the Chicoutimi River;
  south-east of the confluence of the rivière du Moulin and the Saguenay River in the Chicoutimi sector of the city of Saguenay.

  towards the northeast by collecting the discharge (coming from the northwest) of the "Grand lac à Foin" and the "Petit lac à Foin", up to a bend of the river, corresponding to a small lake;
  towards the north while continuing to cross a small lake, until at the outlet (coming from the east) of a stream;
  towards the east by crossing on  a small lake, then north curving northeast, to a stream (coming from the south);
  towards the north-east, forming a large curve towards the west, up to a stream (coming from the south);
  towards the northeast, in particular by crossing a small lake, by collecting a stream (coming from the east), then bending towards the east, to a stream (coming from the south);
 north-east, to its mouth.

The Little Discharge emties on the south bank of the Grosse Décharge. This confluence is located at:
  west of the rivière à Mars course;
  southwest of the course of the Ha! Ha! River;
  south-east of Bagotville Airport terminal;
  northeast of the course of the rivière du Moulin;
  south-west of the confluence of the Mars river and the Baie des Ha! Ha!;
  south-east of downtown Saguenay.

Toponymy 
The toponym "La Petite Décharge" was formalized on June 29, 1983, at the Place Names Bank of the Commission de toponymie du Québec.

Notes and references

Appendices

Related articles 
 Le Fjord-du-Saguenay Regional County Municipality
 Lac-Ministuk, a TNO
 Zec Mars-Moulin, a ZEC
 La Grosse Décharge (Mars River tributary)
 Rivière à Mars
 Baie des Ha! Ha!
 Saguenay River
 List of rivers of Quebec

Rivers of Saguenay–Lac-Saint-Jean
Le Fjord-du-Saguenay Regional County Municipality